William Kilborn Knott (17 February 1940 – 12 March 2014) was an American poet.

Life

Born in Carson City, Michigan, US, Knott received his MFA from Norwich University and studied with John Logan in Chicago.

His first collection of poems, The Naomi Poems: Corpse and Beans, was published in 1968 under the name Saint Geraud, a fictional persona whose backstory included a suicide two years prior to the publishing. The Naomi Poems was well received and brought him to the attention of such poets as James Wright, who called him an "unmistakable genius."

Knott taught at Emerson College for more than 25 years, published many books of poetry, and was awarded the Iowa Poetry Prize and a Guggenheim fellowship.

Work

Early in his career, Knott was noted for writing unusually short poems, some as short as one line, and untitled. Later he became interested in metrical verse forms and syllabics. He was not a believer in poetic "branding" and throughout his career refused to restrict himself to one particular school or style of writing. His poetry's subjects, themes and tones were also wide-ranging. His work often displayed a wry, self-deprecating sense of humor, and he was critical of what he saw as an epidemic of humorlessness in contemporary American poetry. Poets who cite him as an influence include Thomas Lux, Mary Karr, Stephen Dobyns, Denise Duhamel, Denis Johnson, and Janaka Stucky. One of Johnson's novels, Already Dead: A California Gothic, was inspired by Knott's "Poem Noir."

A selection of his work, I Am Flying Into Myself: Selected Poems, 1960-2014, was compiled by Thomas Lux and published by Farrar, Straus and Giroux in February 2017.

Knott was also a visual artist, known for giving away booklets of his poetry with hand-painted covers.

Bibliography
Books published by Bill Knott include: 
The Naomi Poems: Book One: Corpse and Beans (1968), Follett, under the pseudonym 'St. Geraud'
Aurealism: A Study (1969), Salt Mound Press. (chapbook)
Auto-Necrophilia; The _ Poems, Book 2 (1971), Big Table Pub., 
Nights of Naomi (1972), Big Table (chapbook)
Love Poems to Myself (1974), Barn Dream Press, Boston,  (chapbook)
Rome in Rome (1976), Release Press.
Selected and Collected Poems (1977), SUN
Becos (1983), Random House, 
Outremer (1989), University of Iowa Press, 
Poems 1963-1988 (1989), University of Pittsburgh Press, 
Collected Political Poems 1965-1993 (1993) Self-published chapbook
Sixty Poems of Love and Homage (1994) Self-published chapbook
The Quicken Tree (1995), Boa Editions, Hardcover  Softcover 
Laugh at the End of the World: Collected Comic Poems 1969-1999 (2000), Boa Editions, 
The Unsubscriber (2004), Farrar, Straus and Giroux, 
Stigmata Errata Etcetera (2007), Saturnalia Books, 

He also collaborated on a novel with James Tate, Lucky Darryl (Release Press, 1977).

References

External links
Bill Knott Poetry Forum - open discourse / interpretation of Bill Knott's work
billknottblog.blogspot.com - Bill Knott's blog
billknottartblog.blogspot.com - Bill Knott's art blog
americanpoems.com - A short biography and several poems by Bill Knott

1940 births
2014 deaths
American male poets
People from Carson City, Michigan
Norwich University alumni
Chapbook writers
20th-century American poets
20th-century American male writers